The Latin American Newspaper Association  ( Latin Post ) (PAL) is a press group representing media organizations in Latin America. Founded in 2008, it represents 16 newspapers in 11 countries, as well as magazines.

Aims 
PAL's stated objectives are
Promoting the technical exchange and professional among its members
Promoting the exchange of contents among its members
International marketing of their products

Members

Argentina
Clarín
Chile
La Tercera, La Cuarta
Colombia
El País (Colombia), El Universal (Colombia), La Vanguardia, El Colombiano, El Espectador
Dominican Republic
Diario Libre
El Salvador
El Diario de Hoy
Ecuador
Diario HOY
Honduras
La Prensa (Honduras)
Nicaragua
La Prensa (Managua)
Peru
La República
Spain
El Mundo (Spain)
Venezuela
El Universal (Caracas), La Verdad (Zulia), El Informador (Barquisimeto)

See also
 European Dailies Alliance
 Leading European Newspaper Alliance
 Grupo de Diarios América
 Asia News Network

References

External links 
 
 official website
Clarín - Congreso de editores de diarios de la región 
Diario La República - Se realiza en Lima la quinta reunión de PAL 

Newspaper associations
Spanish-language newspapers
Latin American media
Organizations established in 2008